
Palau is an island nation in the Pacific Ocean.

Palau may also refer to:

Places
 Palau, Italy, a municipality in the Province of Sassari, Sardinia, Italy
 Palaú, a town in Múzquiz, Coahuila, Mexico
 Palau-de-Cerdagne
 Palau-del-Vidre
 Palau-solità i Plegamans

People
 Antonio Palau y Verdera, (1734–1793), Spanish naturalist
 Francisco Palau, (1811–1872), beatified Discalced Carmelite Spanish priest
 Josep Palau i Fabre, (1917–2008), Catalan poet
 Luis Palau (1934–2021), Argentine-born Christian evangelist
 Luis Argentino Palau, Argentine chess player
 Laia Palau (1979–), Spanish basketball player
 Pierre Palau (1883–1966), French actor

Plants
Palau or palaw (also palawan, palauan, or payaw), the common name of the giant swamp taro in the Philippines

Other 
 Palauan language, an Austronesian language, spoken in Palau and Guam
 Orquesta Hermanos Palau, Cuban musical group
 Kabuli Palaw (also known as Palau), an Afghan rice dish
 Survivor: Palau, the tenth installment of the reality program Survivor

See also 
Bälau
Palao (disambiguation)
Palu, a chartered city (kota) on the Indonesian island of Sulawesi